Broken Sun is a 2008 Australian film set in 1944 about a World War II veteran who meets an escaped Japanese POW. The story is partly based on the Cowra breakout of 1944. The film was the debut feature from Brad Haynes.

Reception
Reviewing the film for The Sydney Morning Herald, critic Sandra Hall, while admiring the efforts of first-time director Brad Haynes, concluded that it "suffers at times under the weight of its anti-war theme".

References

External links

Broken Sun at Australian Screen Online
Variety review

Australian World War II films
2000s English-language films
World War II prisoner of war films
Films set in 1944
Films set on the home front during World War II
2000s war films
2000s Australian films